Pouteria platyphylla is a species of plant in the family Sapotaceae. It is found in Brazil and Peru.

References

platyphylla
Near threatened plants
Taxonomy articles created by Polbot
Taxa named by Charles Baehni
Taxa named by Albert Charles Smith